WAFN-FM (92.7 MHz) is an American radio station licensed to serve the community of licensed to Arab, Alabama. The station, established in 1977, is currently owned by Fun Media Group, Inc., broadcasts an classic hits format, and features programming from United Stations Radio Networks.

The station was originally WCRQ-FM, which had various formats. The call letters are currently used by a station in Calais, Maine. The station was assigned the WAFN-FM call letters by the Federal Communications Commission on September 9, 1999.

In addition to its usual music programming, WAFN-FM is an affiliate of the Tennessee Titans football radio network.

References

External links

AFN-FM
Classic hits radio stations in the United States
Radio stations established in 1977
1977 establishments in Alabama